Thang Long can refer to:

Hanoi
Former name of Hanoi
Imperial Citadel of Thăng Long
Thăng Long Bridge
Thang Long Warriors, basketball team

Communes in Vietnam
Thăng Long, Hải Dương Province, in Kinh Môn, Hải Dương Province
Thăng Long, Thái Bình Province, in Đông Hưng District, Thái Bình Province
Thăng Long, Thanh Hóa Province, in Nông Cống District, Thanh Hóa Province

See also
Tang Long (disambiguation)